Erik Nielsen may refer to the following people:

 Erik Nielsen (1924–2008), Canadian lawyer and politician
 Erik Nielsen (conductor) (born 1977), American conductor
 Erik Nielsen (footballer, born 1932), Danish footballer
 Erik Nielsen (footballer, born 1937), Danish footballer
 Erik Nielsen (footballer, born 1938), Danish footballer
 Erik Charles Nielsen (born 1981), American actor

See also
 Erik Nielson (disambiguation)